Sundawas is a village in Hisar tehsil and district in the Indian state of Haryana. Sundawas is located on Balsamad Road via Siswala around 24 KM away from District center Hisar (city).    Village is located near to eastern border of Rajasthan just distance of 10 K.M. It is last village on Haryana side with fertile black soil.

History 
As per government of India 1981 records Village was also known as Sundawala. Sundawas was connected modern road via siswala - Sundawas road during 1973. It took almost a decade when next road was notified for village. Sundawas was connected with balsamand via road in 1984.

Government 
Sundawas village is administrated by Gram Panchayat Sundawas under the provisions of constitution of India and Panchayati raj (India)

Gram Panchayat of Sundawas is comprised by total 10 ward members and 1 Sarpanch. Mrs. Pinki is current Sarpanch of Sundawas.

Law and Order 
Sundawas falls under the Sadar Hisar police station. Near police beat is situated in Balsamand

Notable Cases 
October 9, 2001 , 6 person were seriously hurt in a group clash between two student groups of Sundawas and Rawalwas village at Chandan Nagar near Hisar. As per report there was incident of gun fire.  Police FIR was registered against students involved in attack.

Demography 
Sundawas had 2600 people as per 2011 census by Indian Government. Village has only Hindu religion follower.

Education

School Education 
There are four schools in Sundawas.  3 State government funded  and 1 private school.

Government Senior Secondary School also provides admission to pupil from Siswala village.

Higher education 
Sundawas does not have collage for university level education. Following are the nearest collage for higher education.

Health 
Sundawas has a sub primary health center, 2 Pharmacy. There are no doctors in the village.

Nearest Hospital is 6 km away in balsamand

Economy and infrastructure 
Majority of people work in farming sector. Poor people from backward communities are offered jobs under National Rural Employment Guarantee Act, 2005 in village by Gram Panchayat.

Transport

Road 
Sundawas is well connected via road with village Siswala in east, Balsamand in west, BHIWANI ROHILLA in north and Dobhi and Kharia in South. Nearest highway is Hisar-Bhadra road can be accessed via Bhiwani Rohilla village in 4 km distance.

Haryana Roadway Bus service provides connectivity from Sundawas to Hisar (city), balsamand, Kharia on daily basis. No good service of buses in the village only 2-3 buses only provide service

Rail 
Sundawas does not have any railway station within 10 km proximity. Nearest railway major railway station is Hisar Junction railway station in 24 km distance. Hisar Junction provides connectivity to Delhi, Mumbai, Jaipur, udaipur, Chandigarh Jodhpur, Vaishno Devi, Hyderabad, gorakhpur, ahmedabad

Air 
Hisar Airport  (30 km) is nearest domestic airport to Sundawas. Indira Gandhi International Airport Delhi is nearest (193 km via road) international airport which provides connectivity to major countries. Chandigarh Airport is second nearest international airport with 264 km distance via road. Hisar airport (Maharaja Agrasen airport) 24km form sundawas

In News 
Protests were held against the state government on 4 November 2014 related to a water crisis in 30 villages of Adampur. Sundawas was one of the beneficiaries of Balsamand Canal for drinking and irrigation water. The government over the year had reduced the water supply to this canal. Farmers demanded two week supply against one week supply in a month. The BJP Government promised but did not provide water until the article was added.

On 17 January 2018 Harpal Dhayal Pass the Chartered Accountancy Course and Become First Chartered Accountant of Village

On 21 October 2022 , Sundawas featured in TV Total Haryana amid of Adampur Constituency Byelection. All the political parties were tried their best to get the votes. although majority people of Sundawas voted for Congress still Mr Bhavya Bishnoi won the overall election by great margin. He was able to secure 51.32% votes (67492 votes out of 131523)

References 

Villages in Hisar district